This is a list of Southern Oregon Raiders football players in the NFL Draft.

Key

Selections

References

Lists of National Football League draftees by college football team

Southern Oregon Raiders NFL Draft